Kapooka is a suburb in the south-west of Wagga Wagga, New South Wales, Australia.

Kapooka is home to the Department of Defence's Blamey Barracks from where the Army Recruit Training Centre conducts its operations.

It is located on the Olympic Highway, between Wagga Wagga and Uranquinty.

References

External links 

Suburbs of Wagga Wagga